The RAF 4 was a British air-cooled, V12 engine developed for aircraft use during World War I. Based on the eight–cylinder RAF 1 it was designed by the Royal Aircraft Factory but produced by the two British companies of Daimler and Siddeley-Deasy. The RAF 5 was a pusher version of the same engine.

Turbocharger
A turbocharged experimental version of the RAF 4, the RAF 4d, was developed using a Rateau exhaust-driven turbocharger. The engine was test-flown in a R.E.8, but the turbocharging experiments were abandoned after the turbine failed on 4 May 1918.

Variants
RAF 4
1914 - Prototype engine, 140 horsepower (104 kW).
RAF 4a
1917 - Main production variant, 150 horsepower (112 kW). 3,608 built.
RAF 4d
1916 - 180 horsepower (134 kW), experimental supercharger installation. 16 built.
RAF 4e 
1917 - 240 horsepower (180 kW), strengthened cylinders and enlarged valves.
RAF 5
1915 - 150 horsepower (112 kW), pusher version with fan-cooling.
RAF 5b
170 horsepower (127 kW), increased bore version of RAF 5.

Applications

RAF 4

Armstrong Whitworth F.K.8
Bristol F.2 Fighter
Royal Aircraft Factory B.E.12
Royal Aircraft Factory R.E.7
Royal Aircraft Factory R.E.8
Siddeley-Deasy R.T.1
Vickers F.B.14

RAF 5
Royal Aircraft Factory F.E.2
Royal Aircraft Factory F.E.4

Engines on display
A preserved RAF 4a engine is on public display at the Science Museum (London).

Specifications (RAF 4a)

See also

References

Notes

Bibliography

 Gunston, Bill. World Encyclopaedia of Aero Engines. Cambridge, England. Patrick Stephens Limited, 1989. 
 Hare, Paul R. The Royal Aircraft Factory. London: Putnam, 1990. 
 Lumsden, Alec. British Piston Engines and their Aircraft. Marlborough, Wiltshire: Airlife Publishing, 2003. .

1910s aircraft piston engines